Mike Yurcich (born November 5, 1975) is an American football coach who currently serves as offensive coordinator at Penn State. He was the offensive coordinator at University of Texas Austin in 2020 prior to Penn State. He was the passing game coordinator and quarterbacks coach at the Ohio State University for the 2019 season. Yurcich was the offensive coordinator at Oklahoma State University from 2013 to 2018. He was previously the offensive coordinator and quarterbacks coach at Saint Francis, Edinboro, and Shippensburg. Yurcich also spent some time at Indiana as a graduate assistant.

Some of the prominent players Yurcich has helped develop include Trevor Harris, Zach Zulli, J. W. Walsh, Mason Rudolph, Taylor Cornelius, Justin Fields, Sam Ehlinger, and Sean Clifford.

Personal life
Yurcich earned a degree in psychology at California and a master's degree in education from St. Francis, where he picked up a school counseling license.

Playing career
Yurcich is a 1999 graduate of California University in Pennsylvania. He spent three seasons as the school’s starting quarterback and was a two-year captain. He began his playing career at Mount Union College.

Coaching career
Mike Yurcich was named Penn State's offensive coordinator and quarterbacks coach on January 8, 2021.
Yurcich (YER-sitch), has 22 years of collegiate coaching experience, including 15 as an offensive coordinator, joins the Nittany Lions after spending the 2020 season at Texas as the offensive coordinator and quarterbacks coach.
In his career as an FBS offensive coordinator, Yurcich’s offenses have averaged 6.49 yards per play, which ranks first among OC’s since 2013 and 14.03 yards per completion, which is first among Power Five OC’s in that timeframe.
Since 2013, Yurcich’s offenses have scored 50 or more points 26 times and 40 or more points 51 times (50 percent of games coached), both of which are tops among FBS offensive coordinators since 2013. His teams average 61.5 touchdowns per year.

References

External links
 Penn State profile
 Oklahoma State profile

1975 births
Living people
American football quarterbacks
California Vulcans football players
Edinboro Fighting Scots football coaches
Indiana Hoosiers football coaches
Ohio State Buckeyes football coaches
Oklahoma State Cowboys football coaches
Penn State Nittany Lions football coaches
Saint Francis Cougars football coaches
Shippensburg Red Raiders football coaches
Texas Longhorns football coaches
People from Euclid, Ohio